Riverdale Park is a census-designated place (CDP) in Stanislaus County, California, United States. The population was 1,128 at the 2010 census, up from 1,094 at the 2000 census. It is part of the Modesto Metropolitan Statistical Area.

Geography
Riverdale Park is located at  (37.611054, -121.043786).

Demographics

2010
The 2010 United States Census reported that Riverdale Park had a population of 1,128. The racial makeup of Riverdale Park was 575 (51.0%) White, 6 (0.5%) African American, 25 (2.2%) Native American, 29 (2.6%) Asian, 0 (0.0%) Pacific Islander, 414 (36.7%) from other races, and 79 (7.0%) from two or more races. Hispanic or Latino of any race were 700 persons (62.1%).

The Census reported that 1,125 people (99.7% of the population) lived in households, 3 (0.3%) lived in non-institutionalized group quarters, and 0 (0%) were institutionalized.

There were 298 households, out of which 151 (50.7%) had children under the age of 18 living in them, 153 (51.3%) were opposite-sex married couples living together, 57 (19.1%) had a female householder with no husband present, 36 (12.1%) had a male householder with no wife present.  There were 33 (11.1%) unmarried opposite-sex partnerships, and 2 (0.7%) same-sex married couples or partnerships. 36 households (12.1%) were made up of individuals, and 15 (5.0%) had someone living alone who was 65 years of age or older. The average household size was 3.78.  There were 246 families (82.6% of all households); the average family size was 3.98.

The population was spread out, with 371 people (32.9%) under the age of 18, 117 people (10.4%) aged 18 to 24, 309 people (27.4%) aged 25 to 44, 251 people (22.3%) aged 45 to 64, and 80 people (7.1%) who were 65 years of age or older.  The median age was 29.6 years. For every 100 females, there were 108.5 males.  For every 100 females age 18 and over, there were 105.7 males.

The homeowner vacancy rate was 1.7%; the rental vacancy rate was 8.1%.  616 people (54.6% of the population) lived in owner-occupied housing units and 509 people (45.1%) lived in rental housing units.

2000
As of the census of 2000, there were 1,094 people, 289 households, and 238 families residing in the CDP. The racial makeup of the CDP was 66.36% White, 1.19% African American, 2.10% Native American, 0.09% Asian, 0.27% Pacific Islander, 24.59% from other races, and 5.39% from two or more races. Hispanic or Latino of any race were 50.55% of the population.

There were 289 households, out of which 46.0% had children under the age of 18 living with them, 58.1% were married couples living together, 15.6% had a female householder with no husband present, and 17.6% were non-families. 11.4% of all households were made up of individuals, and 5.2% had someone living alone who was 65 years of age or older.  The average household size was 3.72 and the average family size was 3.99.

In the CDP, the population was spread out, with 35.1% under the age of 18, 7.9% from 18 to 24, 30.3% from 25 to 44, 19.0% from 45 to 64, and 7.8% who were 65 years of age or older.  The median age was 31 years. For every 100 females, there were 107.2 males.  For every 100 females age 18 and over, there were 111.3 males.

The median income for a household in the CDP was $35,217, and the median income for a family was $37,386. Males had a median income of $30,000 versus $24,688 for females. The per capita income for the CDP was $11,066.  About 14.2% of families and 20.7% of the population were below the poverty line, including 30.4% of those under age 18 and 4.2% of those age 65 or over.

Government

References

Census-designated places in Stanislaus County, California
Census-designated places in California